Charles W. "Bill" Fromhold (August 11, 1942 – September 30, 2010) was an American politician who served in the Washington House of Representatives from the 49th district from 2001 to 2009.

He died of leukemia on September 30, 2010, in Seattle, Washington at age 68.

References

1942 births
2010 deaths
Democratic Party members of the Washington House of Representatives